Colonel  Pascoe Christian Victor Francis Grenfell, 2nd Baron Grenfell   (12 December 1905 – 24 September 1976) was a peer in the House of Lords .

Background
Grenfell was the son of Margaret Majendie and Field Marshal The Lord Grenfell, who had fought in the Ninth Xhosa War, the Anglo-Zulu War, and the Anglo-Egyptian War.

Life
Educated at Eton, he succeeded to the barony at his father's death in 1925. Until 1936 he served in the King's Royal Rifle Corps. Having fought in World War II, he was mentioned in despatches. Decorated with the American Legion of Merit, he was given the Territorial Decoration in 1951. He became a Deputy Speaker in the House of Lords and was appointed to the Order of the British Empire as a Commander in 1974.

References

1905 births
1976 deaths
People educated at Eton College
Commanders of the Order of the British Empire
Barons in the Peerage of the United Kingdom
Pascoe
King's Royal Rifle Corps officers
Officers of the Legion of Merit
British Army personnel of World War II